Sonya Cassidy is a British actress.

Career 
Cassidy is known for her roles as Clara in the BBC period drama The Paradise, as Celine Ashworth in the police detective series Vera, as the Oracle in Syfy fantasy series Olympus, and as Hester in the Channel 4 science fiction series Humans. Cassidy starred in the AMC television series Lodge 49. She also has some film appearances and has also done theatre work.

In 2022, she starred in the science fiction series The Man Who Fell to Earth, a television adaptation of the Walter Tevis novel.

Filmography

References

External links
 

Year of birth uncertain
Place of birth missing (living people)
Living people
British actresses
Year of birth missing (living people)